The Parish Church of the Sacred Heart of Jesus is an 18-century Roman Catholic church in Laranjeiras, Sergipe, Brazil. It was the second church built in Laranjeiras, following the Church of Our Lady of the Conception of Comandaroba, which was built by the Jesuits in the early 18th century. The church was listed as a historic structure by National Institute of Historic and Artistic Heritage (IPHAN) in 1941. The church is dedicated to the Sacred Heart of Jesus and is constructed in the Baroque style. The Parish Church belongs to the Roman Catholic Archdiocese of Aracaju.

History

Construction of Parish Church of the Sacred Heart of Jesus began at the end of the 18th century. Residents of Laranjeiras, then a district of Nossa Senhora do Socorro with a small port on the river, petitioned Queen Maria for the construction of a church in 1790. With the completion of the church, Laranjeiras had two churches: the Parish Church and the Church of Our Lady of the Conception, which belonged to the Comandaroba Plantation. The church was unable to accommodate the population of Laranjeiras, which grew rapidly in the 18th century, and the building was enlarged in 1905.

Location

The Parish Church of the Sacred Heart of Jesus is located on a high point above a bend in the Cotinguiba River. The church faces the river but, unusually, does not open to Praça da Matriz. The south façade of the church, which faces the public square, has numerous small portals and windows.

Structure

The Parish Church of the Sacred Heart of Jesus was built of mixed masonry of stone and brick. The church has two bell towers with a monumental pediment at center. The pediment has volutes and is topped by a cross. There are windows at the choir level with a quatrefoil oculus above the middle window. The bell towers have windows similar to those at the choir level. The windows of the bell gable are arched; the gables have domes decorated with tiles and topped by similarly tiled pinnacles.

Interior

The interior has a rectangular plan with a single nave, chancel, and two sacristies. The altar is simple with an altarpiece with a painting of the Holy Family. The painting of the ceiling of the chancel is of the Sacred Heart of Jesus, and is attributed to José Teófilo de Jesus. A side chapel dedicated to the Blessed Sacrament is located left of the altar, and has a separate door of glass and wood. A painting of the Last Supper is located in the side chapel, and is attributed to Antônio Dias.

Notable artwork

O Sagrado Coração, painting of the chancel ceiling, José Teófilo de Jesus
O Cenáculo da Última Ceia, painting in Chapel of the Sacrament, attributed to Antônio Dias

Protected status

The Parish Church of the Sacred Heart of Jesus was listed as a historic structure by the National Institute of Historic and Artistic Heritage in 1941. It was listed in the Book of Historical Works as no. 294, and was a federally protected site in Laranjeiras.

References

Baroque church buildings in Brazil
Roman Catholic churches in Bahia
17th-century Roman Catholic church buildings in Brazil
National heritage sites of Sergipe
Portuguese colonial architecture in Brazil
1709 establishments in the Portuguese Empire